Sins of the Fathers is a 1948 Canadian film about the effect of syphilis in a small Canadian town. Ben Edwards is a crusading doctor who tries to pass a public health law, against the hypocritical opposition of the leaders of the community who profit from prostitution and slums. Finally the opponents find out that they themselves have syphilis and have transmitted it to their own children. The film incorporates educational films produced by the U.S. Public Health Service. Directed by Phil Rosen, it was very successful at the box office.

References

External links
Sins of the Father at IMDb
Review of film at Variety
Sins of the fathers, U.S. National Library of Medicine, Digital Collections. Includes downloadable video and transcript.

1948 films
Canadian drama films
1948 drama films
Canadian black-and-white films
English-language Canadian films
Films about syphilis
Films directed by Phil Rosen
1940s Canadian films